Golden Balls is a 1993 film directed by Bigas Luna which stars Javier Bardem.

Plot
Benito González is a flamboyant engineer in Melilla, with a brash and pushy personality. His dream is to build the tallest building ever in the region. After his girlfriend leaves him, he devotes himself entirely to his ambitions, deciding to let nothing get in his way. He marries the daughter of a billionaire, intending to use her father's money to realise his project. Benito waltzes his way through a career of excess, fetishes and deceptions, but the personal conflicts he unleashes ultimately send his life spiraling down to disaster.

The film makes direct and symbolic references to the work of Spanish Surrealist painter Salvador Dalí.

Cast

See also 
 List of Spanish films of 1993

References 
Citations

Bibliography

External links
 
 
 

1993 films
1990s Spanish-language films
1993 drama films
Films shot in Madrid
Films directed by Bigas Luna
Spanish drama films
Films scored by Nicola Piovani
Films set in Melilla
1990s Spanish films